Árpád Ritter (born 12 June 1975) is a Hungarian former wrestler who competed in the 1996 Summer Olympics, in the 2000 Summer Olympics, and in the 2004 Summer Olympics.

References

External links
 

1975 births
Living people
Olympic wrestlers of Hungary
Wrestlers at the 1996 Summer Olympics
Wrestlers at the 2000 Summer Olympics
Hungarian male sport wrestlers
Wrestlers at the 2004 Summer Olympics